Spieth is a surname. Notable people with the surname include:

Herman Spieth (1905–1988), American zoologist and university administrator
Jacob Spieth, founder of Spieth and Krug Brewery
Jordan Spieth (born 1993), American golfer

See also
Spieth and Krug Brewery, also known as "Union Hall" and "Maxey Block", a brewery established in 1867 in Bozeman, Montana, by two German immigrants, Jacob Spieth and Charles Krug